The 2003 Fylde Borough Council election took place on 1 May 2003 to elect members of Fylde Borough Council in Lancashire, England. The whole council was up for election with boundary changes since the last election in 1999 increasing the number of seats by two. The Conservative Party gained overall control of the council from no overall control.

Election result

|}

Two Independent councillors were uncontested.

Ward results

Ansdell

Ashton

Central

Clifton

Elswick & Little Eccleston

Fairhaven

Freckleton East

Freckleton West

Heyhouses

Kilnhouse

Kirkham North

Kirkham South

Medlar with Wesham

Newton & Treales

Park

Ribby with Wrea

Singleton & Greenhalgh

St John's

St Leonard's

Staining & Weeton

Warton & Westby

References

2003 English local elections
2003
2000s in Lancashire